Georg Lietz is a West German sprint canoer who competed in the late 1950s. He won two gold medals at the 1958 ICF Canoe Sprint World Championships in Prague, earning them in the K-4 1000 m and K-4 10000 m events.

References
 
 
 

German male canoeists
Possibly living people
Year of birth missing (living people)
ICF Canoe Sprint World Championships medalists in kayak